Too Late to Die Young is a 2018 Chilean drama film directed by Dominga Sotomayor Castillo. She became the first woman ever to win the Leopard for Best Direction at the Locarno Festival.

Plot 
This coming-of-age tale takes place around the New Year's Eve of 1990 in Chile, in the intentional rural community of Comunidad Ecológica de Peñalolén, located in the precordillera of Santiago. The story follows a teenage girl named Sofía (played by Demian Hernández) as she navigates adolescence.

Cast
 Demian Hernández
 Antar Machado
 Magdalena Tótoro
 Matías Oviedo
 Andrés Aliaga
 Antonia Zegers
 Alejandro Goic
 Eyal Meyer
 Mercedes Mujica
 Gabriel Cañas
 Michael Silva
 Paola Lattus

Reception 
The site's critics' consensus reads: "Too Late to Die Young uses one family's experiences as the foundation for a dreamily absorbing drama with a poignant, lingering warmth." On Metacritic the film holds an 80 out of 100 average score based on 15 reviews, indicating "generally favorable reviews".

References

External links
 

2018 films
2018 drama films
2010s Spanish-language films
Chilean drama films